The Sine-Gordon equation is a nonlinear hyperbolic partial differential equation in 1 + 1 dimensions involving the d'Alembert operator and the sine of the unknown function. This equation attracted a lot of attention in the 1970s due to the presence of soliton solutions.

Origin of the equation and its name 

There are two equivalent forms of the sine-Gordon equation. In the (real) space-time coordinates, denoted (x, t), the equation reads:

 

where partial derivatives are denoted by subscripts. Passing to the light-cone coordinates (u, v), akin to asymptotic coordinates where

 

the equation takes the form

 

This is the original form of the sine-Gordon equation, as it was considered in the 19th century in the course of investigation of surfaces of constant Gaussian curvature K = −1, also called pseudospherical surfaces. Choose a coordinate system for such a surface in which the coordinate mesh u = constant, v = constant is given by the asymptotic lines parameterized with respect to the arc length. The first fundamental form of the surface in these coordinates has a special form

 

where  expresses the angle between the asymptotic lines, and for the second fundamental form, L = N = 0. Then the Codazzi–Mainardi equation expressing a compatibility condition between the first and second fundamental forms results in the sine-Gordon equation. The study of this equation and of the associated transformations of pseudospherical surfaces in the 19th century by Bianchi and Bäcklund led to the discovery of Bäcklund transformations. Another transformation of pseudospherical surfaces is the Lie transform introduced by Sophus Lie in 1879, which corresponds to Lorentz boosts in terms of light-cone coordinates, thus the sine-Gordon equation is Lorentz-invariant.

The name "sine-Gordon equation" is a pun on the well-known Klein–Gordon equation in physics:

 

The sine-Gordon equation is the Euler–Lagrange equation of the field whose Lagrangian density is given by

 

Using the Taylor series expansion of the cosine in the Lagrangian,

 

it can be rewritten as the Klein–Gordon Lagrangian plus higher-order terms:

Soliton solutions 

An interesting feature of the sine-Gordon equation is the existence of soliton and multisoliton solutions.

1-soliton solutions 
The sine-Gordon equation has the following 1-soliton solutions:

 

where

 

and the slightly more general form of the equation is assumed:

 

The states  are known as vacuum states, as they are constant solutions of zero energy. The form of the 1-soliton solutions can be obtained through application of a Bäcklund transform to the trivial (constant vacuum) solution and the integration of the resulting first-order differentials:

 

 

for all time.

The 1-soliton solutions can be visualized with the use of the elastic ribbon sine-Gordon model introduced by Julio Rubinstein in 1970. Here we take a clockwise (left-handed) twist of the elastic ribbon to be a kink with topological charge . The alternative counterclockwise (right-handed) twist with topological charge  will be an antikink.

2-soliton solutions 

Multi-soliton solutions can be obtained through continued application of the Bäcklund transform to the 1-soliton solution, as prescribed by a Bianchi lattice relating the transformed results. The 2-soliton solutions of the sine-Gordon equation show some of the characteristic features of the solitons. The traveling sine-Gordon kinks and/or antikinks pass through each other as if perfectly permeable, and the only observed effect is a phase shift. Since the colliding solitons recover their velocity and shape, such kind of interaction is called an elastic collision.

Another interesting 2-soliton solutions arise from the possibility of coupled kink-antikink behaviour known as a breather. There are known three types of breathers: standing breather, traveling large-amplitude breather, and traveling small-amplitude breather.

3-soliton solutions 

3-soliton collisions between a traveling kink and a standing breather or a traveling antikink and a standing breather results in a phase shift of the standing breather. In the process of collision between a moving kink and a standing breather,
the shift of the breather  is given by

 

Bäcklund transformation

Suppose that  is a solution of the sine-Gordon equation

Then the system

where a is an arbitrary parameter, is solvable for a function  which will also satisfy the sine-Gordon equation. This is an example of an auto-Bäcklund transform.

By using a matrix system, it is also possible to find a linear Bäcklund transform for solutions of sine-Gordon equation.

For example, if  is the trivial solution , then  is the one soliton solution with  related to the boost applied to the soliton.

Zero-curvature formulation
The sine-Gordon equation is equivalent to the curvature of a particular -connection on  being equal to zero.

Then the zero-curvature equation

is equivalent to the sine-Gordon equation . The zero-curvature equation is so named as it corresponds to the curvature being equal to zero if it is defined .

Related equations

The  is given by

 

This is the Euler–Lagrange equation of the Lagrangian

 

Another closely related equation is the elliptic sine-Gordon equation, given by

 

where  is now a function of the variables x and y. This is no longer a soliton equation, but it has many similar properties, as it is related to the sine-Gordon equation by the analytic continuation (or Wick rotation) y = it.

The elliptic sinh-Gordon equation may be defined in a similar way.

Another similar equation comes from the Euler–Lagrange equation for Liouville field theory

A generalization is given by Toda field theory.

Quantum version

In quantum field theory the sine-Gordon model contains a parameter that can be identified with the Planck constant. The particle spectrum consists of a soliton, an anti-soliton and a finite (possibly zero) number of breathers. The number of the breathers depends on the value of the parameter. Multiparticle productions cancels on mass shell.

Semi-classical quantization of the sine-Gordon model was done by Ludwig Faddeev and Vladimir Korepin. The exact quantum scattering matrix was discovered by Alexander Zamolodchikov.
This model is S-dual to the Thirring model, as discovered by Coleman.
 This serves as an example of boson-fermion correspondence in the interacting case. Further, for a critical, non-zero value , the theory is in fact dual to a free massive Dirac field theory.

Infinite volume and on a half line

One can also consider the sine-Gordon model on a circle, on a line segment, or on a half line. It is possible to find boundary conditions which preserve the integrability of the model. On a half line the spectrum contains boundary bound states in addition to the solitons and breathers.

Supersymmetric sine-Gordon model

A supersymmetric extension of the sine-Gordon model also exists. Integrability preserving boundary conditions for this extension can be found as well.

See also 
 Josephson effect
 Fluxon
 Shape waves

References

External links 
 sine-Gordon equation at EqWorld: The World of Mathematical Equations.
 Sinh-Gordon Equation at EqWorld: The World of Mathematical Equations.
 sine-Gordon equation  at NEQwiki, the nonlinear equations encyclopedia.

Solitons
Differential geometry
Surfaces
Exactly solvable models
Equations of physics
Mathematical physics
Articles containing video clips